Spanfeller Media Group (SMG), a subsidiary of publishing company Tribune Publishing, is a digital media company based in New York City. It was founded in 2010 by Jim Spanfeller, after leading the digital strategy at Forbes.com. Spanfeller Media Group operates two media sites as subject-specific digital destinations, The Daily Meal, dedicated to food and drink, and The Active Times, centered on outdoor sports and an active lifestyle.

History
Spanfeller Media Group (SMG) was founded in June 2010 by Jim Spanfeller. The concept of SMG was to highlight the content aspect of media and commission its websites to design and produce content by, for and about the web. The websites focus on core mass vertical content areas that do not presently have major dominating content sites.

Products

 The Daily Meal, launched in January 2011
 The Active Times, launched in June 2012

Financial
Starting in 2010, SEC fillings show that SMG raised $13,769,700 in funding before being sold to Tribune Publishing.

Tribune Publishing (known as Tronc at time), noted in their Form 10-K for the fiscal year of 2017 that they had "completed acquisitions totaling $7.6 million of Spanfeller Media Group (SMG)".

Governance
SMG’s executive team comprises Jim Spanfeller, President & CEO; Jeff Bauer, Chief Product Officer; Jacqueline Stone, Senior Vice President, Marketing; Philip Barber, Chief Technology Officer; Sharon Jautz, Vice President, Human Resources. Spanfeller previously served as the President and CEO of Forbes.com, serving on the advisory boards of several early-stage Web start-ups. He has received numerous industry accolades such as the first ever Founders Award from the Interactive Advertising Bureau (IAB) for lifetime achievement. Currently, Spanfeller is Secretary of the Online Publisher’s Association (OPA) and is a Chairman Emeritus of the IAB.

References

External links
 The Daily Meal
 The Active Times

Further reading
 	Crain’s New York, July 28, 2013, Food industry develops taste for tech
 	Folio: Mag, February 12, 2013, Spanfeller Media Lands $5 Million Series C Round
 	Publishing Executive, August 16, 2012, Spanfeller Media Group's Daily Meal 'The Fastest Growing Website of its Kind'
 	Folio: Mag, June 26, 2012, Spanfeller Media Launches Second Website 
 	New York Post, June 21, 2012, Getting Active
 	Adexchanger.com, May 8, 2012, Jim Spanfeller: Publishers Need To Question The Rush To RTB
 	Business Insider, August 2, 2011, Ex-Forbes.com CEO’s Spanfeller Media Group Scores $6 Million in Funding
 	Digiday, May 27, 2011, Jim Spanfeller on Publishing in the Social Era 
 	New York Post, September 15, 2010, Spanfeller Media Dishing Up 
 	Paid Content, August 10, 2010, Spanfeller Media Group Names SoftBank’s Perlis Chairman 
 	AdWeek, August 10, 2010, Spanfeller Preps Launch for 2nd Site 
 	Social Times, August 10, 2010, Spanfeller Media Group’s First Site to Be Food-Related 
 	Media Post Raw, August 10, 2010, Spanfeller Media Gets Funding 
 	Business Insider, August 10, 2010, Former Forbes.com CEO, Jim Spanfeller Raises Money for Food Startup 
 	Business Insider, August 10, 2010, Former Forbes.com CEO Jim Spanfeller Dishes on His Forthcoming Food Website 
 	Eater National, August 10, 2010, Former Forbes.com Publisher Jim Spanfeller Raises Money for a Food Website 
 	New York Post, June 30, 2010, New Internet Gives Some Thought For Food 
 	Folio: Mag, June 29, 2010, Spanfeller Nears $2M in Funding for Startup 
 	All Things D, June 29, 2010, Former Forbes.com Publisher Jim Spanfeller Has VC Money; New Site on the Way

Publishing companies based in New York City
2016 mergers and acquisitions
Tribune Publishing